Álvaro Gaona Vega (born 15 June 1985) is a Mexican professional boxer and is the current WBC FECARBOX middleweight champion.

Professional career
On February 6, 2010, Gaona beat Gilberto Flores Hernandez by a 12-round unanimous decision to win the WBC FECARBOX middleweight title. The bout was held in Guadalajara, Mexico.

References

External links

People from Reynosa
Boxers from Tamaulipas
Middleweight boxers
1985 births
Living people
Mexican male boxers